Nidal Algafari (born December 18, 1965) is a Bulgarian director, former executive director of the Bulgarian National Television and political PR of Arab descent. He is a NATFIZ graduate. His father is Syrian, and his mother is Bulgarian. He is married to Madlen Algafari, with whom they have a son and a daughter. 

Author and director of the student-run TV program Ku-Ku. Chief editor of 'Show and entertainment programs' for BNT. Director of a feature film 'La donna e mobile'. Producer and director of TV broadcasts 'Nablyudatel' (literally 'Observer') and 'Anonsi' (Future events or Announcements). Nidal Algafari is director of the documentary film 'Syria - history and legends'. From June 2002 to May 2004 he was the executive director of the Bulgarian National Television.

1965 births
Living people
Bulgarian people of Syrian descent
Bulgarian television directors
People from Damascus